The UNTV Cup Season 1 was the 2013 season of the public service-based basketball league, the UNTV Cup based in the Philippines. It was opened on July 29, 2013 at the Smart Araneta Coliseum, Cubao, Quezon City. Its final games were held on November 5, 2013 at the same venue.

UNTV Cup started its first season with a ceremonial toss on July 29, 2013 and it was expected to end in January 2014 but it ended early on November 5 of the same year. The project is aimed to promote unity, camaraderie and physical fitness among government officials in the country.

Teams 
The following are the teams of public officials:

Players

Celebrities 
Actors who are included in the teams are:
 Michael Flores and Brando Legaspi for the AFP Cavaliers team
 Kier Legaspi and Zoren Legaspi join team PhilHealth Advocates team
 Eric Fructuoso and Jao Mapa playing for team DOJ Hunters team
 Allen Dizon and Emilio Garcia for the MMDA Equalizers team
 Ervic Vijandre and Jay Manalo play the Congress/LGU Legislators team
 Onyok Velasco and Jordan Herrera play for PNP Hinirangs
 Jon Hall and James Blanco for the Judiciary Cagers

Other guests 
One public official who was invited to join is boxing legend and Sarangani congressman Manny Pacquiao to play for Congress/LGU Legislators team.

Elimination round 
The elimination round began on July 29, 2013 at the Smart Araneta Coliseum in Quezon City. The schedule followed a single round robin format in which all teams faced each other once, for a total of 6 games per team.
After the elimination round, the bottom team is eliminated. The top 2 teams get outright semifinals spots, while the remaining 4 teams battle it out on the quarterfinals, with #3 team facing #6, and #4 seed playing against #5.

Playoffs 
There are six teams that qualified for the playoffs. The top two teams, (#1) PNP Hinirangs and (#2) Judiciary Cagers, already advance to the semifinals, holding also the twice-to-beat advantage. The remaining four teams will fight for the final two semifinal slots. (#3) AFP Cavaliers and (#4) PhilHealth Advocates will have a twice-to-beat advantage on the quarterfinals against (#6) Congress-LGU Legislators and (#5) MMDA Equalizers, respectively.

Quarterfinals 
The #4 team PhilHealth Advocates have a twice-to-beat advantage against #5 ranked MMDA Equalizers, while #6 seed Congress-LGU Legislators needs to win two games versus #3 squad AFP Cavaliers.

Both higher seeded teams won their respective series. PhilHealth thump MMDA in one game, 87–65, while AFP beat Congress-LGU, 92–73, to advance to the semifinals. The Advocates face top team PNP Hinirangs, and the Cavaliers sets a date with #2 seed Judiciary Cagers.

(3) AFP Cavaliers vs. (6) Congress-LGU Legislators

(4) PhilHealth Advocates vs. (5) MMDA Equalizers

Semifinals 
The PNP Hinirangs and Judiciary Cagers have a twice-to-beat advantage in the semifinals after being the top 2 teams at the end of the elimination round. Quarterfinals winners AFP Cavaliers and PhilHealth Advocates would need to win twice to enter the finals.

PNP and Judiciary finished the series early by beating NHA and AFP, respectively, in one game.

(1) PNP Hinirangs vs. (4) PhilHealth Advocates

(2) Judiciary Cagers vs. (3) AFP Cavaliers

Battle for Third Place: (3) AFP Cavaliers vs. (4) PhilHealth Advocates 

The battle for third place was between #3 seed AFP Cavaliers and #4 seed PhilHealth Advocates, after they lost their semifinals series on separate opponents with a twice-to-beat disadvantage. AFP won the game, 96–84, and gets ₱250,000 for their chosen beneficiary as third placer. Despite the loss, PhilHealth received ₱150,000 for charity as fourth placer.

Exhibition Game: Professional Basketball Legends vs. Team All Stars 

Before the much-awaited championship match between PNP Hinirangs and Judiciary Cagers, an exhibition game that served as the curtain raiser was held, with two squads composed of former professional basketball legends and Kuya Daniel Razon's team.

Professional Basketball Legends 
The Professional Basketball Legends team is composed of former professional basketball players listed below. They wore blue jerseys.
 #3 Ed Cordero (deputy commissioner)
 #5 Ronnie Magsanoc (color commentator)
 #6 Atoy Co (commissioner)
 #10 Freddie Hubalde
 #13 Manny Paner
 #14 Yoyong Martirez
 #24 Sev Sarmenta (play-by-play commentator)
 #30 Gerry Esplana (Congress-LGU Legislators)
 #37 Tito Varela
 #44 Jerry Codiñera (studio analyst)
 #77 Bai Cristobal
Head Coach: Jerry Codiñera

Team All Stars 
The Team All Stars is composed of celebrities and UNTV Cup players listed below. They wore white jerseys.
 #7 Kuya Daniel Razon (President & CEO, BMPI-UNTV)
 #1 Dave Almarinez (Congress-LGU Legislators)
 #3 Bayani Agbayani
 #9 Cyril Santiago (MMDA Equalizers)
 #20 Cong. Sherwin Tugna (Congress-LGU Legislators)
 #26 Ervic Vijandre (Congress-LGU Legislators)
 #27 Cong. Scott Davies Lanete (Congress-LGU Legislators)
 #30 Vice Mayor Francis Zamora (Congress-LGU Legislators)
 #44 Rey "PJ" Abellana
 #45 Cong. Niel Tupas Jr.
 #60 German Panghulan (Vice President for Administration, BMPI-UNTV)
 #71 Jeffrey Sanders (MMDA Equalizers)
Head Coach: Kenneth Duremdes

Result

UNTV Cup Finals: (1) PNP Hinirangs vs. (2) Judiciary Cagers 

The best-of-three finals series was held on October 27 and November 5, 2013, at the Treston International College Gym, Fort Bonifacio (now located in Bonifacio Global City), Taguig City and Smart Araneta Coliseum in Cubao, Quezon City, respectively. The championship is between the undefeated #1 team PNP Hinirangs and second seed Judiciary Cagers. Both teams won their separate semis matchups with the twice-to-beat advantage. Judiciary won the finals series against PNP, 2–0, to get the inaugural UNTV Cup title and donate ₱1 million to their chosen beneficiary. PNP received ₱500,000 for their charity as runner-up.

Winners and Beneficiaries 
Every team represents their choice of charity institution. The champion will win one million pesos and first runner-up team will win five hundred thousand pesos to be given to the charity chosen by the winning teams.

Individual awards

Season awards 

Scoring Champion:
Step Up Player of the Year:
Defensive Player of the Year:
First Five:

Most Valuable Player:
Season MVP: Ollan Omiping (PNP Hinirangs)
Finals MVP:

Players of the Week 
The following players were named the Players of the Week.

Cumulative standings

Elimination rounds

Playoffs

UNTV Cup Segments

Heart of a Champion 
The Heart of a Champion segment features UNTV Cup players and their lives off the court as public servants.

Top Plays 
The following segment features the top plays of the week and elimination round.

Player, Analyst and Fan Interviews 
UNTV Cup players, analysts, and fans share their thoughts in interviews.

See also 
 UNTV Cup

References

External links 
 UNTVweb.com

Members Church of God International
2013 Philippine television series debuts
2013 in Philippine sport
UNTV Cup
UNTV (Philippines) original programming